German submarine U-585 was a Type VIIC U-boat of Nazi Germany's Kriegsmarine during World War II.

She carried out four patrols, but sank no ships. She was a member of one wolfpack.

The boat was sunk by a drifting German mine in the Barents Sea on 30 March 1942.

Design
German Type VIIC submarines were preceded by the shorter Type VIIB submarines. U-585 had a displacement of  when at the surface and  while submerged. She had two shafts and two  propellers.

U-585 was fitted with five  torpedo tubes (four fitted at the bow and one at the stern), fourteen torpedoes, one  SK C/35 naval gun, 220 rounds, and a  C/30 anti-aircraft gun. The boat had a complement of between forty-four and sixty.

Service history
The submarine was laid down on 1 October 1940 at Blohm & Voss, Hamburg as yard number 561, launched on 9 July 1941 and commissioned on 28 August under the command of Kapitänleutnant Ernst-Bernward Lohse.

She served with the 6th U-boat Flotilla from 28 August 1941 for training and stayed with that organization for operations until her loss, from 1 December 1941 until 30 March 1942.

First patrol
U-585s first patrol was preceded by a trip to Trondheim then Neidenfjord [west northwest of Murmansk], both in Norway over Christmas and New Year's Eve 1941–42. The patrol itself started in Neidenfjord on 15 January 1942 and finished in Kirkenes on the 21st.

Second patrol
Her second foray was notable for the loss overboard of Fahnrich zur See [midshipman] Eberhard Vollmer on 5 February 1942 in the southern Barents Sea.

Third patrol
The boat was attacked with depth charges by three enemy ships northeast of Kirkenes on 24 March 1942. The damage to the forward torpedo tubes was serious enough to require the submarine to return to her base.

Fourth patrol and loss
While in Varanfjord, the Soviet submarine M-171 fired both of her torpedoes at an unknown, but outbound U-boat. This can only have been U-585, although she did not report any attack.

She was sunk on 30 March 1942 by a German mine that had drifted from the 'Bantos-A' barrage.

Forty-four men died with U-585; there were no survivors.

Previously recorded fate
U-585 was sunk on 29 March 1942 by the British destroyer . It was later ascertained that this attack was against  and caused no damage.

The boat was also claimed to be sunk by the Soviet destroyer Gremyashiy on 30 March 1942. This attack was against  and was also inconclusive.

References

Bibliography

External links

German Type VIIC submarines
U-boats commissioned in 1941
U-boats sunk in 1942
U-boats sunk by mines
Maritime incidents in March 1942
1941 ships
Ships built in Hamburg
Ships lost with all hands
World War II submarines of Germany